The 1903 European Rowing Championships were rowing championships held in Giudecca, an island in the Venetian Lagoon, on the Giudecca Canal on a day in the middle of August. The competition was for men only and they competed in five boat classes (M1x, M2x, M2+, M4+, M8+).

Medal summary

Footnotes

References

European Rowing Championships
European Rowing Championships
Rowing
Rowing
European Rowing Championships
Rowing competitions in Italy
Venetian Lagoon